Charles Uniacke Mader (April 10, 1856 – May 27, 1929) was a merchant and political figure in Nova Scotia, Canada. He represented Lunenburg County in the Nova Scotia House of Assembly as a Liberal member from 1904 to 1911.

Early life
He was born in Maders Cove, Lunenburg County, Nova Scotia, the son of Francis Mader, of German descent, and Mary Andrews.

Career
He first worked as a clerk in a general store and then went into business on his own in Mahone Bay in 1880. Mader built a general store in Mahone Bay in 1887 and also operated a fishing fleet. He served as a member of the local school board.

Death
He died in Mahone Bay on May 27, 1929.

Personal life
He married Martha Ernst in 1880. In 1884, he married Charlotte A. Keddy after the death of his first wife.

References

 

1856 births
1929 deaths
Nova Scotia Liberal Party MLAs